The 1986 Austral-Asia Cup was held in Sharjah, UAE, between April 10–18, 1986. Five national teams took part: Australia, India, New Zealand, Pakistan and Sri Lanka.

The 1986 Austral-Asia Cup was a knock-out tournament. Sri Lanka qualified automatically for the semi-finals by virtue of winning the 1986 Asia Cup. Despite losing their first-round match, New Zealand qualified for the semi-finals as the first-round loser with the lesser margin of defeat.

Pakistan won the tournament, defeating India in the final, and won US$40,000.

The tournament was played for the joint benefit of Vijay Hazare, Dilip Vengsarkar, Javed Miandad and Wazir Mohammad.

Matches

First round

Semi-finals

Final

See also
 Austral-Asia Cup

References

 Cricinfo tournament page
 Cricket Archive tournament page
 
 

International cricket competitions from 1985–86 to 1988
Austral-Asia Cup, 1986
1986 in Emirati sport
International cricket competitions in the United Arab Emirates